Prick was a free monthly tabloid-sized magazine, published in Atlanta, Georgia, covering the tattoo and piercing industry. It also had sections on music, movies, books and other products relevant to the tattoo and piercing world.

History and profile
Prick was founded in 2000 by Charles D. Brank. It was published by CDB Enterprises and was available in tattoo shops, record stores, and music venues, aiming towards a main reading demographic of 18- to 34-year-olds.

It was distributed the first of every month and the magazine's circulation reached over 100,000

The magazine was also published free online for every issue. The final issue was published in 2012.

References

External links
 

2000 establishments in Georgia (U.S. state)
2012 disestablishments in Georgia (U.S. state)
Body piercing
Defunct magazines published in the United States
Free magazines
Lifestyle magazines published in the United States
Magazines established in 2000
Magazines disestablished in 2012
Magazines published in Atlanta
Media depictions of tattooing
Monthly magazines published in the United States